Wheeler Fork is a stream in the U.S. state of West Virginia.

Wheeler Fork was named after a man named Wheeler who settled the area.

See also
List of rivers of West Virginia

References

Rivers of Lewis County, West Virginia
Rivers of West Virginia